Corregidora (1975) is a fiction novel written by Gayl Jones set in Kentucky in the late 1940s. The novel centers around Ursa Corregidora, who was recently hospitalized after an accident involving a flight of stairs. The first three sections of the novel follow Ursa through her recovery, her changing relationships, and her profession as a blues singer. The final two sections of Corregidora flash forward to 1969 when Mutt returns. Jones uses a fragmented style of writing to incorporate the Corregidora family history of trauma into Ursa's present narrative. Overall, Corregidora considers difficult themes of generational trauma, preservation of memory, domestic and sexual violence, and womanhood and motherhood. Literary critics have highly regarded Jones' writing in this novel.

Summary

Section I 
The novel opens with Ursa Corregidora recounting her marriage with Mutt Thomas and the "accident" on the staircase behind Happy's Café. Ursa wakes up in the hospital, and soon after, Tadpole McCormick brings her to his home above Happy's. Tadpole takes care of Ursa while she is recovering, and the reader learns that Ursa had a hysterectomy as the result of falling down the stairs. Through Ursa's memories, the reader discovers that Ursa's Great Gram was a slave who was raped by her master and other men who would pay for her. When U.C. is five years old, Great Gram describes how she was also forced to sleep with the master's wife, and Ursa is slapped for questioning the story. While recovering, Ursa is paid a visit by her neighbor, Cat Lawson, who tells Ursa that Mutt has been hanging outside of Happy's, hoping to see her. Ursa then admits to Cat that she was pregnant when the accident happened, and she lost the baby. Ursa visits the doctor and states that she is filing for divorce from Mutt. After her appointment, Ursa goes to stay with Cat for the remainder of her recovery, but this does not last long. Jeffy touches Ursa's breasts while she is sleeping, and later, Ursa hears Cat threatening Jeffy in her bedroom early in the morning. Ursa returns to stay with Tadpole, and the couple begin a sexual relationship. That night, Ursa begins singing at Happy's again, and after her show, Jimmy asks Ursa if she would speak to Mutt, telling her she is pitying herself. Upstairs, Tadpole learns that Mutt signed the divorce papers and asks Ursa to marry him. Ursa and Tadpole get married with Cat as their witness, and Cat speaks to Ursa alone after the wedding. U.C. barely acknowledges Cat and refuses to ignore what she heard that night in Cat's bedroom. The section ends with Ursa singing to Tadpole, and the newlywed couple making love.

Section II 
The section opens with Ursa speaking to Sal and calling on memories about how she is often mistaken to be Spanish. In the apartment, Tadpole tells Ursa that Cat is planning on moving to Versailles. Ursa's sex with Tadpole is uncomfortable for her and more for his pleasure. When Ursa wakes up from a night of irregular sleep, Tadpole describes how his Papa was a slave that became a blacksmith, but his Mama was denied the land he had bought when she went to claim it. Then, Ursa remembers how her Great Gram remained with Corregidora after slavery was abolished, but in 1906, Great Gram and Gram moved to Louisiana and began working. Tadpole urges Ursa to be more relaxed during sex, but Ursa is still uneasy. Ursa is reminded of her arguments with Mutt over the men who watched her sing at Happy's. Ursa gets an offer to sing Saturdays at the Spider and takes the job. One night, Tadpole doesn't come to pick up Ursa, and she finds him in bed with Vivian, a young new singer. Tadpole says that Vive can do more him than Ursa can, and Ursa leaves to check into the Drake hotel. A few days later, Tadpole shows up to apologize, but Ursa does not feel sympathetic to his pleading. Ursa begins singing full-time at the Spider, and Max praises her singing and how she has helped his business. Max makes a sexual advance on Ursa, but Ursa denies him and makes him promise not to come onto her ever again if she is to continue working. The text begins to flash forward to conversations between Mutt and Ursa about rekindling their romance and the blues. Ursa describes to Mutt how her life is tied into the lives of her ancestors and how the memories of their trauma still affect her. Ursa returns to her small hometown, Bracktown, to see her Mama who is making preserves for her neighbor. Ursa seeks for more history than Corregidora, asking her mother about who her father was. Ursa learns that her father, Martin, worked at a restaurant across the street from the depot, where Mama used to have lunch. Mama was very shy and would not respond to Martin when he asked her about herself. One day, Mama had dinner at the restaurant too, and Martin offered to ride the bus with her. They stopped by his house to get his jacket, and Mama went upstairs with him. After Ursa was conceived, Mama was surprised by her own actions and stopped speaking to Martin. When Martin sent Mama money awhile later, Mama returned the money to him. At his house in Cincinnati, Martin beat Mama, claiming that she used him to get pregnant. In the present, Ursa and Mama begin walking back to the bus station. Mama then describes the brief time that she was married to Martin before he left. Great Gram had begged him to marry Mama, and they lived in the house of the Corregidora women together. While Mama did not talk to Martin about Corregidora much, he could hear Great Gram and Gram remembering their trauma. Mama was not having sex with Martin, and after a fishing trip, Gram caught Martin watching her powder her breasts. Gram and Martin cursed at one another, and Martin started walking outside the house to get to the front room. After their conversation, Ursa gets on the bus and heads back into the city.

Section III 
The third section opens with Ursa remembering the suicide of the Melrose woman and her childhood friend, May Alice. May Alice was older than Ursa and taught Ursa what penises and periods were. In high school, May Alice started having sex with a boy from school, Harold, and became pregnant. After Mama told Ursa not to hang around May Alice anymore, Ursa did not see her until she had her baby and once more before she moved. Mary Alice asked Ursa why she didn't like her any longer and called Ursa a child for not telling her. Then, Ursa remembers how Mama did not like her singing the blues, which led her to move to the city and apply at Happy's. Ursa remembers meeting Mutt at Happy's, sitting with him after her performance and talking about the blues. After this, Ursa and Mutt began talking in Ursa's dressing room, where Ursa learned that Mutt's great-grandfather bought his and his wife's freedom. When his great-grandfather got into debt, they took his wife, and he went crazy. That night, Mutt made a sexual advance, but Ursa turned him down, remembering the Corregidora women. They did not have sex until their wedding night. After four months, Mutt began watching the other men at Happy's and pressuring Ursa to stop performing. Ursa remembers the building tension between them over Mutt's jealousy and mood swings. One Friday night, Mutt and Ursa go to Dixieland to see a band from Chicago. Mutt embarrasses Ursa by grabbing her butt and trying to grind, so Ursa does not take his hand to dance again and goes to the bathroom instead of singing. The married couple went home, and Mutt defends his actions and threatens her for not taking his hand. The next night Mutt shows up to Happy's drunk and is thrown out after trying to take Ursa off of the stage. When Ursa leaves Happy's after the evening show, Mutt drunkenly returns to confront Ursa and knocks her down the stairs.

Section IV 
This section flashes forward to June of 1969 when Ursa is forty-seven and still working at the Spider. Ursa speaks to a man who is performing at the Drake hotel about the blues and remembers how Corregidora raped her Great Gram. Ursa had not seen Sal since she left Happy's and had only run into to Tadpole a few times since leaving him. She heard that Tadpole had gotten together with Vivian and sold Happy's. Ursa saw Jeffrene downtown who told her that she had pneumonia recently. Jeffrene also mentioned that Cat was living in Versailles and had a hair accident, and she asked Ursa if she would go see her.

Section V 
Jim still came into the Spider at least once a week, and once got drunk and harassed Ursa. Sal came in to talk to Ursa after her show, telling her that she had seen Mutt. Ursa admits that she had been thinking about Mutt but does not know how she feels about him. Soon after, Mutt came into the Spider while Ursa was singing; she sang to him but knew she hadn't forgiven him. Mutt asked Ursa if she would come back with him, and she said yes. Back at the Drake hotel, Mutt and Ursa have oral sex, and Ursa thinks about what Great Gram did to Corregidora to make him both hate and desire her. The novel ends with Mutt holding Ursa, and Ursa crying against him.

Characters

 Ursa Corregidora is a twenty-five year-old black female blues singer and the protagonist of the novel. She is the daughter of a line of enslaved women who were raped by their master. Ursa describes carrying this family history with her everywhere she goes. At the start of the novel, an incident causes her to lose a baby and have a hysterectomy. Ursa also struggles with this trauma throughout the novel.
Mutt Thomas sees Ursa performing at Happy’s one day, and Ursa begins singing to him. The two develop a relationship and are married in 1947. Soon after, Mutt becomes increasingly jealous of the men who watch Ursa perform. Mutt begins aggressively grabbing Ursa in public and threatening to take her off the stage. The young couple also develops sexual tension and manipulative tendencies in their relationship. Ursa becomes more vocal and stands up for herself against Mutt’s ravings. In April 1948, Mutt drunkenly confronts Ursa on her way home from Happy’s, and she “falls” down a staircase in an alleyway. Ursa blames Mutt for the incident and the two are divorced. At the conclusion of the novel, in 1969, the two rekindle their relationship.
 Tadpole McCormick is the owner of Happy’s Café. Ursa describes Tadpole as a “square-jawed and high-cheekboned” Kentucky man. When Mutt tries to take Ursa home during a performance, Tadpole has him thrown out of the club and ensures that he does not return. Tadpole visits Ursa in the hospital and brings Ursa to his home above Happy’s to stay with him. Other than her brief time at Cat’s house, Tadpole cares for Ursa throughout her recovery. The two are married and Ursa begins singing at Happy’s once again. Ursa leaves Tadpole after discovering he has cheated on her with Vivian, a new young performer at Happy’s. 
Catherine (Cat) Lawson initially lives across the street from Happy’s Café, the club where Ursa works for most of the novel. Cat sometimes does hair from her home, and she takes Ursa in for a few days after her time in the hospital. However, Ursa leaves when she is groped by Jeffy and realizes that Cat is a lesbian. After leaving Cat’s house, Ursa refuses to talk to Cat, and Cat eventually moves to Versailles.
 Jeffrene (Jeffy) is the young girl who Cat mentors and feeds. When Jeffy and Ursa share a bed for the night at Cat’s house, Jeffy irks Ursa by bringing up Mutt, then grabs Ursa’s breasts in the middle of the night. After Cat moves, Ursa sometimes sees Jeffy around town and crosses the street to avoid her. When Ursa is forty-seven, she learns about Cat’s hair accident from Jeffrene who also asks Ursa to see Catherine. 
Sal Cooper works during the day at Happy's Café and is friendly with Ursa after she marries Tadpole. The two women weren't at Happy's during the same shifts, so they did not talk very often. 
 Jimmy is Mutt’s cousin who comes into Happy’s while Ursa is singing and later, Spider. Jimmy questions Ursa about her relationship with Tadpole and asks Ursa to talk to Mutt. 
 Max is the owner of Spider who hires Ursa to sing. Max tries to begin a relationship with Ursa, but Ursa quickly shuts down his advances. The two maintain a professional relationship, and Max often reiterates how Ursa is an asset to his establishment.

Themes

Generational trauma 
Gayl Jones opens the novel in  the 1940s, but the temporal landscape of the Corregidora women begins in 19th century Brazil with Great Gram or “Dorita” — the woman with the coffee-bean skin, the “favorite” of Corregidora, the Portuguese slaveholder. Jones’ novel traces the histories of the Corregidora women through Ursa, the great-grandchild of Dorita, illustrating a genealogical history contrived through an economy of sexual violence rendered by slavery. In turn, the Corregidora women embody a practice of remembrance, or “holding up evidence” by “making generations”, in such a way that specifies their wombs as a site of redoubling- a redoubling that centralizes their purported reproductive capacities as a conduit for both reprisal and redress that renders their trauma legible. For Ursa, the space of the past consumes and entraps her, becoming her identity. The past becomes a restricting force as Ursa longs for an individual life separate and outside of Corregidora.

Ursa Corregidora's narrative is intertwined with the histories of the slave owner, Corregidora, and her female ancestors. Ursa's Great Gram was a slave of Corregidora who he raped, and she became pregnant with Gram. Gram was then raped by Corregidora and became pregnant with Ursa's mother. Ursa's family moved to Louisiana after the abolition of slavery in Portugal.  At as early as five-years of age, Ursa describes her grandmother telling her these histories and insisting she remember them. Ursa carries the history of these traumas with her everywhere, and they impact how she develops her relationships. Both Mutt and Tadpole question the significance of the stories of Corregidora and how they affect Ursa's romances. The generational trauma passed down by her maternal ancestry is a prominent topic throughout the novel. 

The connection between trauma and memory is often discussed in scholarly articles about Corregidora. In particular, academics have considered how Ursa's familial trauma under slavery affects her romantic relationships in the present. In her critical essay, Stella Setka discusses the impacts of this "traumatic rememory" inherited from her ancestry. Setka considers how this collective trauma influences Ursa's sexuality and agency.

Preservation of memory 
Ursa describes a pressure from her mother and grandmother to "make generations." After one night with Martin, a man who worked at the café across the street, Ursa's mother becomes pregnant with her. She describes that her whole body wanted Ursa. Ursa feels this urge to "make generations" but is unable to do so after her hysterectomy. Ursa's grandmother emphasizes how important it is to continue sharing their histories of sexual violence and slavery. The women use their lineage and oral history as a documentation of the truth to be used as evidence. By preserving these memories through their children, the Corregidora women plan to ensure that their stories are never forgotten.  

Literary scholars have emphasized how the Corregidora actively preserve memory through their oral histories. According to this discussion, the ongoing recounting of Corregidora history becomes enmeshed with the present narrative in the novel. Abdennebi Ben Beya is one of the scholars analyzing this tension between past and present. Beya considers history to be a haunting presence in Corregidora, emphasizing the simultaneous mourning and healing in re-experiencing this trauma. 

The carrying forth, working through and bearing witness to trauma(s) are memory preservation methods. Great Gram, Gram, Mama and Ursa each carry re-membering(s) in their bodies and in their names. The repetition of Corregidora's is how Great Gram, Gram, Mama and Ursa hold on to what Christina Sharpe calls a "long psychic and material reach" (p. 4) of the traumas of chattel slavery and sexual violence. How they respectively respond to, live, witness and work through these traumas spills out into their interactions with each other and the other Black people they encounter, live with, have sex with and socialize with throughout the text. Ursa is both a witness to generations of trauma, through the re-hearing of the stories and through living with the women who lived the recounted experiences, and positioned to work through its effects in ways that Great Gram, Gram and Mama will never be able to. Ursa also represents what will not be worked through as she cannot/will not create more generations. There is a witness and work stoppage with Ursa and the last man she is with in the novel. At first thought, Ursa's return to Mutt seemed like a choice rooted in an inability to work through the trauma she experienced in her own body and those of her foremothers. Upon deeper reflection, Ursa's return resonates as her way of continuing that work and witnessing through confronting a vehicle of trauma (Mutts verbal abuse, controlling demands and later physical violence) in ways that her foremother did not narrate directly to her, but she senses or realizes. ‘‘In a split second I knew what it was, in a split second of love and hate I knew what it was, and I think he might have known too." (p. 62) Jones leaves the reader in that moment of remembering, re-enacting and mal/attempt towards reversal.

Sexual and domestic violence 
The initial conflict presented in the novel is how Ursa's fall causes her to lose a fetus and her uterus. While Ursa's neighbors and friends claim that it was an accident, Ursa states that Mutt knocked her down the stairs, indicating that it was an instance of domestic violence. Ursa's mother is also hit repeatedly by Ursa's father when visiting him to return an envelope he sent with money. Since Ursa's grandmothers were raped by their slaveowners, Jones writes a violent history for all of the Corregidora women. Ursa's hysterectomy and the history of violence in her family affect how she navigates her sexuality throughout the novel. 

In critical essays that discuss Corregidora, the theme of sexual and domestic violence is connected to the themes of trauma and history. Because the violence in Ursa's intimate relationships is reflected in the rape and trauma the Corregidora women underwent in slavery, scholars draw connections between painful collective memories and the violence in the present narrative. Specifically, Joanne Lipson Freed points out the duplication of sexual exploitation in each of the lives of each Corregidora woman. Freed ties the repetition of trauma into the collective memory of the African American community. 

Particularly in Aliyyah Abdur-Rahman's Against the Closet: Black Political Longing and the Erotics of Race, Abdur-Rahman reads incest as a motif in contemporary Black women’s literature.  Moving from Baldwin to Morrison to Jones to concretize incest as motif, she encapsulates the ways in which incest as a figurative sexual arrangement is conditioned upon an unintelligibility — a “disruptive chronology”, fragmented subjectivities, and traces of the tragic, the obscene, and parodic — made manifest by the line of Corregidora women that ends and finds release with Ursa (Abdur-Rahman 127). The unintelligibility of the text rests alongside her contention that black woman/motherhood and black girlhood “exist along the same continuum of black female representation” — such as Ursa’s incapacity for to speak plainly and her reliance on the blues.

Womanhood and motherhood 
The Corregidora women Ursa recounts in the novel form a matrilineal ancestry. Particularly, Ursa describes the histories of her Great Gram, Gram, and Mama. Ursa describes how the Corregidora women were compelled to "make generations," connecting motherhood to remembering their trauma. Ursa describes a responsibility in her family to become women by bearing children. When Ursa has a hysterectomy, she also concerns herself with how being unable to have children will affect her womanhood. Ursa's loss of a child also connects motherhood and womanhood to the violence in Corregidora.

Academic articles that evaluate Jones' Corregidora recurrently analyze the themes of womanhood and motherhood. Scholars consider how these two topics are connected in the experiences of the Corregidora women. Ifeona Fulani analyzes how the mother-daughter relationships in the novel frame the black female subject. Fulani takes a psychological approach to understanding this correlation, noting the influence of gender and conflict on the community.

Critical response 
Gayl Jones' use of language in Corregidora has been highly regarded since its publication in 1975. Particularly, critics have placed Gayl Jones among a canon of Black women writers for her manipulation of structure and speech as literary devices. Critics have also praised Jones' emphasis on the oral history of African American language. 

Other than the overall favorable critical response Jones has received for Corregidora, the novel has been critiqued for lacking detailed physical descriptions of its characters.  In an interview by Claudia Tate, Gayl Jones describes her intention to draw on the African American tradition of oral storytelling. Tate's subsequent remark that Corregidora felt like a private story in her reading forms the critique that the novel is unable to reproduce an oral history.

Writers including James Baldwin and Maya Angelou have commented on Corregidora as honest and painful as well as a murky American tale (respectfully).

References 

1975 American novels
Novels set in Kentucky
Novels set in the 1940s
Random House books
African-American novels